Alireza Sabouri is an Iranian football forward who currently plays for Sardar Bukan football club Sardar Bukan in League 2.

Club career

Sepidrood
Sabouri started his career with Sepidrood from Division 2. He was the best scorer of 2012–13 season with 12 times netting.

Foolad Novin
In Winter 2015 he joined Foolad Novin. He was part of Foolad Novin champion squad in 2014–15 Azadegan League.

Naft Tehran
Sabouri joined Naft Tehran in summer 2015 after success in technical test. He made his professional debut for Naft Tehran on August 19, 2015 in 2015–16 Iran Pro League against Malavan as a substitute for Aloys Nong.

Club career statistics

Honours

Club
Foolad Novin
 Azadegan League (1): 2014–15

Individual
Sepidrood
 Iran Football's 2nd Division Top Goalscorer: 2012–13

References

External links
 Alireza Sabouri at IranLeague.ir

Living people
1993 births
Iranian footballers
Naft Tehran F.C. players
Sportspeople from Gilan province
Association football forwards
Association football wingers